The term Western Latin character sets may refer to:
 Western Latin character sets (computing), the binary representation of characters
 In typography, the repertoire of letters, numbers and symbols that is typical of each of the languages